Little Warley is a village and former civil parish, now in the unparished area of Brentwood, in the Brentwood district, in the county of Essex, England. It is situated south of Thorndon Country Park. In 1931 the parish had a population of 395. On 1 April 1934 the parish was abolished and merged with Brentwood, part also went to Little Burstead.

The first outbreak of the 2001 United Kingdom foot-and-mouth outbreak occurred here.

Since 2003 the area around St Peter's Church, but not the entire former parish, has formed part of the reconstituted civil parish of West Horndon.

Notable people 
Albert Thomas "Robert" Marley, paternal grandfather of Jamaican musician Bob Marley, was born in the parish in 
1851.

St Peter's Church rectors

References

Villages in Essex
Former civil parishes in Essex
Brentwood (Essex town)